Lottia limatula is a species of true limpet, a marine gastropod mollusk in the family Lottiidae.

References

Lottiidae
Gastropods described in 1864
Taxa named by Philip Pearsall Carpenter